The 2009 Yokohama BayStars season features the BayStars quest to win their first Central League title since 1998.  The team made a bit of a splash just before the season, signing former Hokkaido Nippon Ham Fighters starter Ryan Glynn to shore up their rotation, led by veterans Daisuke Miura and Hayato Terahara.

On the offensive side, the 'Stars picked up Dan Johnson, a journeyman minor leaguer, to give protection to 2008 batting champion Seiichi Uchikawa and slugging third baseman Shuichi Murata.

The year did not start well even before the regular season started.  The 'Stars lost Murata to a pulled hamstring muscle during the 2009 World Baseball Classic in a seeding game against Team Japan's arch-rival Korea.  The injury hurt the team in the worst way, as Yokohama's bad luck with batting with runners in scoring position continued from 2008.  The BayStars scored just five runs in their first six games en route to another rough start in April.

Towards the end of May, BayStars manager Akihiko Ohya announced that he was taking a sabbatical, which turned into his resignation.  Ohya's sudden resignation ended his second tenure as Yokohama manager.  He had been manager previously from 1996 to 1997 and helped to put together the 1998 Japan Series Championship team.  Ni-gun manager Tomio Tashiro was called on to replace Ohya, and he seemed to be the logical choice since he had been successful managing the ni-gun Shonan SeaRex.  However, Tashiro could not turn the team's fortunes around as the team stumbled to another last-place finish in the Central League.

Regular season

Standings

Game log

|-align="center" bgcolor="#ffbbbb"
| 1 || April 3 || @Dragons || 4 - 1 || Asao (1-0) || Miura (0-1) || Iwase (1) || 37,678 || 0-1-0
|-align="center" bgcolor="#ffbbbb"
| 2 || April 4 || @Dragons || 6 - 0 || Yoshimi (1-0) || Glynn (0-1) ||  || 36,528 || 0-2-0
|-align="center" bgcolor="#ffbbbb"
| 3 || April 5 || @Dragons || 6 - 0 || Chen (1-0) || Kobayashi (0-1) ||  || 33,496 || 0-3-0
|-align="center" bgcolor="#ffbbbb"
| 4 || April 7 || Giants || 1 - 5 || Takahashi (1-0) || Terahara (0-1) ||  || 20,168 || 0-4-0
|-align="center" bgcolor="#ffbbbb"
| 5 || April 8 || Giants || 1 - 12 || Fukuda (1-0) || Kudoh (0-1) ||  || 16,361 || 0-5-0
|-align="center" bgcolor="#ffbbbb"
| 6 || April 9 || Giants || 2 - 9 || Greisinger (1-1) || Walrond (0-1) ||  || 16,691 || 0-6-0
|-align="center" bgcolor="bbffbb"
| 7 || April 10 || Swallows || 9 - 1 || Miura (1-1) || Sato (1-1) ||  || 12,791 || 1-6-0
|-align="center" bgcolor="#ffbbbb"
| 8 || April 11 || Swallows || 0 - 3 || Ichiba (1-0) || Glynn (0-2) || Lim (3) || 17,817 || 1-7-0
|-align="center" bgcolor="bbffbb"
| 9 || April 12 || Swallows || 5 - 3 || Yamaguchi (1-0) || Kawashima (1-1) || Ishii (1) || 17,972 || 2-7-0
|-align="center" bgcolor="bbffbb"
| 10 || April 14 || @Carp || 1 - 4 || Terahara (1-1) || Otake (1-1) || Ishii (2) || 13,436 || 3-7-0
|-align="center" bgcolor="#ffbbbb"
| 11 || April 15 || @Carp || 3 - 2 || Umetsu (1-0) || Mastny (0-1) || Nagakawa (4) || 17,288 || 3-8-0
|-align="center" bgcolor="bbffbb"
| 12 || April 16 || @Carp || 1 - 2 (10) || Yamaguchi (2-0) || Nagakawa (0-2) || Ishii (3) || 14,476 || 4-8-0
|-align="center" bgcolor="#ffbbbb"
| 13 || April 17 || Tigers || 1 - 5 || Ando (2-0) || Miura (1-2) ||  || 12,250 || 4-9-0
|-align="center" bgcolor="#ffbbbb"
| 14 || April 18 || Tigers || 4 - 9 || Nomi (1-2) || Glynn (0-3) ||  || 25,773 || 4-10-0
|-align="center" bgcolor="bbffbb"
| 15 || April 19 || Tigers || 4 - 2 || Kobayashi (1-1) || Fukuhara (0-2) || Ishii (4) || 24,491 || 5-10-0
|-align="center" bgcolor="#bbbbbb"
| — || April 21 || Carp || colspan=6|Postponed (rained out)
|-align="center" bgcolor="#ffbbbb"
| 16 || April 22 || Carp || 4 - 5 || Schultz (1-0) || Ishii (0-1) || Nagakawa (5) || 16,948 || 5-11-0
|-align="center" bgcolor="#ffbbbb"
| 17 || April 23 || Carp || 2 - 0 || Saito (1-1) || Walrond (0-2) || Nagakawa (6) || 16,772 || 5-12-0
|-align="center" bgcolor="bbffbb"
| 18 || April 24 || @Swallows || 0 - 3 || Miura (2-2) || Ichiba (1-1) || Ishii (5) || 12,512 || 6-12-0
|-align="center" bgcolor="#bbbbbb"
| — || April 25 || @Swallows || colspan=6|Postponed (rained out)
|-align="center" bgcolor="bbffbb"
| 19 || April 26 || @Swallows || 2 - 6 || Glynn (1-3) || Sato (2-2) ||  || 16,185 || 7-12-0
|-align="center" bgcolor="#ffbbbb"
| 20 || April 28 || @Tigers || 8 - 4 || Egusa (2-1) || Yoshikawa (0-1) ||  || 19,163 || 7-13-0
|-align="center" bgcolor="bbffbb"
| 21 || April 29 || @Tigers || 4 - 7 || Walrond (1-2) || Ando (2-1) || Ishii (6) || 46,431 || 8-13-0
|-align="center" bgcolor="#ffbbbb"
| 22 || April 30 || @Tigers || 3 - 2 || Atchison (2-1) || Ishii (0-2) ||  || 45,758 || 8-14-0
|-

|-align="center" bgcolor="bbffbb"
| 23 || May 2 || Dragons || 6 - 1 || Miura (3-2) || Yamai (0-1) ||  || 21,080 || 9-14-0
|-align="center" bgcolor="#ffbbbb"
| 24 || May 3 || Dragons || 0 - 2 || Chen (2-1) || Glynn (1-4) ||  || 23,920 || 9-15-0
|-align="center" bgcolor="#ffbbbb"
| 25 || May 4 || Dragons || 2 - 4  || Saito (1-0)  || Ishii (0-3)  || Hirai (1) || 22,529 || 9-16-0
|-align="center" bgcolor="bbffbb"
| 26 || May 5 || @Giants || 4 - 6 || Walrond (2-2) || Tono (2-2) || Yamaguchi (1) || 45,835 || 10-16-0
|-align="center" bgcolor="#ffbbbb"
| 27 || May 6 || @Giants || 3 - 2 || Yamaguchi (4-0) || Sanada (0-1) ||  || 43,182 || 10-17-0
|-align="center" bgcolor="#ffbbbb"
| 28 || May 7 || @Giants || 7 - 3 || Nishimura (2-0) || Yamaguchi (2-1) ||  || 40,139 || 10-18-0
|-align="center" bgcolor="bbffbb"
| 29 || May 8 || Tigers || 2 - 0 || Miura (4-2) || Ando (2-2) ||  || 13,467 || 11-18-0
|-align="center" bgcolor="bbffbb"
| 30 || May 9 || Tigers || 4 - 0 || Glynn (2-4) || Nomi (2-3) ||  || 23,464 || 12-18-0
|-align="center" bgcolor="#ffbbbb"
| 31 || May 10 || Tigers || 4 - 12 || Fukuhara (2-2) || Kobayashi (1-2) ||  || 23,963 || 12-19-0
|-align="center" bgcolor="#ffbbbb"
| 32 || May 12 || Giants || 3 - 5 || Takahashi (2-0) || Walrond (2-3) || Ochi (5) || 19,691 || 12-20-0
|-align="center" bgcolor="bbffbb"
| 33 || May 13 || Giants || 9 - 8 || Yamaguchi (3-1) || Toyoda (1-1) ||  || 20,412 || 13-20-0
|-align="center" bgcolor="#ffbbbb"
| 34 || May 14 || Giants || 5 - 9 || Greisinger (5-2) || Fujie (0-1) ||  || 19,279  || 13-21-0
|-align="center" bgcolor="#ffbbbb"
| 35 || May 15 || @Dragons || 1 - 0 (10) || Yoshimi (3-2) || Ishii (0-4) ||  || 27,711 || 13-22-0
|-align="center" bgcolor="#ffbbbb"
| 36 || May 16 || @Dragons || 2 - 1 (10) || Iwase (1-1) || Yamaguchi (3-2) ||  || 32,869 || 13-23-0
|-align="center" bgcolor="#ffbbbb"
| 37 || May 17 || @Dragons || 4 - 1 || Kawai (2-0) || Kobayashi (1-3) || Iwase (8) || 33,935 || 13-24-0
|-align="center" bgcolor="#ffbbbb"
| 38 || May 19 || @Marines || 2 - 1 || Karakawa (4-2) || Ishii (0-5) ||  || 16,387 || 13-25-0
|-align="center" bgcolor="bbffbb"
| 39 || May 20 || @Marines || 1 - 4 || Walrond (3-3) || Naruse (2-2) || Yamaguchi (2) || 17,019 || 14-25-0
|-align="center" bgcolor="bbffbb"
| 40 || May 22 || @Lions || 5 - 15 || Miura (5-2) || Wakui (4-2) ||  || 16,323 || 15-25-0
|-align="center" bgcolor="#ffbbbb"
| 41 || May 23 || @Lions || 10 - 6 || Hoashi (2-2) || Glynn (2-5) ||  || 24,471 || 15-26-0
|-align="center" bgcolor="#ffbbbb"
| 42 || May 24 || Eagles || 2 - 5 || Hasebe (3-3) || Kobayashi (1-4) || Aoyama (1) || 18,041 || 15-27-0
|-align="center" bgcolor="bbffbb"
| 43 || May 25 || Eagles || 6 - 5 || Kudoh (1-1) || Aoyama (0-1) ||  || 18,696 || 16-27-0
|-align="center" bgcolor="bbffbb"
| 44 || May 27 || Fighters || 5 - 4 || Kizuka (1-0) || Kikuchi (1-1) || Yamaguchi (3) || 13,062 || 17-27-0
|-align="center" bgcolor="#bbbbbb"
| — || May 28 || Fighters || colspan=6|Postponed (rained out)
|-align="center" bgcolor="#ffbbbb"
| 45 || May 29 || Fighters || 1 - 7 || Fujii (4-2) || Miura (5-3) ||  || 7,349 || 17-28-0
|-align="center" bgcolor="#ffbbbb"
| 46 || May 30 || @Buffaloes || 6 - 4 || Kaneko (5-3) || Glynn (2-6) || Kato (8) || 11,217 || 17-29-0
|-align="center" bgcolor="#ffbbbb"
| 47 || May 31 || @Buffaloes || 3 - 0 || Hirano (2-1) || Kobayashi (1-5) ||  || 14,857 || 17-30-0
|-

|-align="center" bgcolor="#ffbbbb"
| 48 || June 2 || @Hawks || 7-3 || Houlton (4-3) || Mastny (0-2) ||  ||  || 17-31-0
|-align="center" bgcolor="#ffbbbb"
| 49 || June 3 || @Hawks || 3-0 || Fujioka (1-0) || Walrond (3-4) || Mahara (10) ||  || 17-32-0
|-align="center" bgcolor="#bbbbbb"
| 50 || June 5 || Lions || colspan=6|Postponed (rained out)
|-
| 51 || June 6 || Lions ||  ||  ||  ||  ||  || 
|-
| 52 || June 7 || Marines ||  ||  ||  ||  ||  || 
|-
| 53 || June 8 || Marines ||  ||  ||  ||  ||  || 
|-
| 54 || June 10 || @Fighters ||  ||  ||  ||  ||  || 
|-
| 55 || June 11 || @Fighters ||  ||  ||  ||  ||  || 
|-
| 56 || June 13 || @Eagles ||  ||  ||  ||  ||  || 
|-
| 57 || June 14 || @Eagles ||  ||  ||  ||  ||  || 
|-
| 58 || June 16 || Buffaloes ||  ||  ||  ||  ||  || 
|-
| 59 || June 17 || Buffaloes ||  ||  ||  ||  ||  || 
|-
| 60 || June 20 || Hawks ||  ||  ||  ||  ||  || 
|-
| 61 || June 21 || Hawks ||  ||  ||  ||  ||  || 
|-
| 62 || June 26 || @Tigers ||  ||  ||  ||  ||  || 
|-
| 63 || June 27 || @Tigers ||  ||  ||  ||  ||  || 
|-
| 64 || June 28 || @Tigers ||  ||  ||  ||  ||  || 
|-
| 65 || June 30 || Swallows ||  ||  ||  ||  ||  || 
|-

|-
| 66 || July 1 || Swallows ||  ||  ||  || || ||
|-
| 67 || July 3 || Carp || || || || || ||
|-
| 68 || July 4 || Carp || || || || || ||
|-
| 69 || July 5 || Carp || || || || || ||
|-
| 70 || July 7 || @Giants || || || || || ||
|-
| 71 || July 8 || @Giants || || || || || ||
|-
| 72 || July 9 || @Giants || || || || || ||
|-
| 73 || July 10 || @Swallows || || || || || ||
|-
| 74 || July 11 || @Swallows || || || || || ||
|-
| 75 || July 12 || @Swallows || || || || || ||
|-
| 76 || July 14 || @ Carp || || || || || ||
|-
| 77 || July 15 || @ Carp || || || || || ||
|-
| 78 || July 16 || @ Carp || || || || || ||
|-
| 79 || July 17 || Dragons || || || || || ||
|-
| 80 || July 18 || Dragons || || || || || ||
|-
| 81 || July 19 || Dragons || || || || || ||
|-
| 82 || July 20 || Giants || || || || || ||
|-
| 83 || July 21 || Giants || || || || || ||
|-
| 84 || July 22 || Giants || || || || || ||
|-
| 85 || July 28 || @Tigers || || || || || ||
|-
| 86 || July 29 || @Tigers || || || || || ||
|-
| 87 || July 30 || @Tigers || || || || || ||
|-
| 88 || July 31 || @Carp || || || || || ||
|-

Player stats

Batting

Pitching

References

Yokohama BayStars
Yokohama BayStars seasons